David Hurwitz is an actor and voice actor who got his first role in Cousins in 1989. He has been in two anime series, as Sojiro Takase in The Girl Who Leapt Through Time and Mello in Death Note.

Filmography

Film

Television

References

Male television actors
Male voice actors
Living people
Year of birth missing (living people)
Male film actors
Nationality missing